Rosa 'Princess of Wales' is a white blend Floribunda rose cultivar. It was bred by Harkness in the United Kingdom and introduced in 1997.

Naming 
The name 'Princess of Wales' was chosen in honour of Diana, Princess of Wales. She received it as a tribute for her 10-year cooperation with the British Lung Foundation. The rose is said to be one of Diana's favourites. After her death, the proceeds from selling the roses in 1998–99 were donated to the British Lung Foundation.

Description 
The nostalgic floribunda is also known as 'Hardinkum'. It has a double bloom form, and a mild to strong fragrance.

Awards 
In 2002, it was granted the Award of Garden Merit by the Royal Horticultural Society.

References

Memorials to Diana, Princess of Wales
Princess of Wales
1997 introductions